Chrysopelea rhodopleuron, commonly known as the Moluccan flying snake, is a species of gliding snake of the family Colubridae.

Geographic range
The snake is endemic to the islands Ambon and Sulawesi of Indonesia.

Subspecies
 Chrysopelea rhodopleuron rhodopleuron Boie, 1827
 Chrysopelea rhodopleuron viridis Fischer, 1880

References 

Reptiles described in 1827
Reptiles of Indonesia
Colubrids
Gliding snakes